Tillyfourie railway station was a railway station serving Tillyfourie, Aberdeenshire, Scotland.

Originally the station had one platform on the south side of the single track railway, and one siding to the west of the station. By 1900 the line through the station had become a passing loop and there were two platforms connected with a footbridge, a signal box was located to the east. There were three sidings that were able to accommodate most types of goods including live stock.

The station closed on 2 January 1950, the sidings were removed by 1960 when even the daily freight train did not call.



References

Citations

Bibliography

External links

Disused railway stations in Aberdeenshire
Former Great North of Scotland Railway stations
Railway stations in Great Britain opened in 1860
Railway stations in Great Britain closed in 1950